Betsy's Burglar is a 1917 American silent comedy film directed by Paul Powell and starring Constance Talmadge, Kenneth Harlan and Monte Blue.

Cast
 Constance Talmadge as Betsy Harlow 
 Kenneth Harlan as Harry Brent 
 Monte Blue as Victor Gilpin 
 Joseph Singleton as Jasper Dunn 
 Josephine Crowell as Mrs. Dunn 
 Clyde E. Hopkins as Oscar Schlitz 
 Hal Wilson as James 
 Kate Bruce as Mrs. Randall 
 Elmo Lincoln

References

Bibliography
 Langman, Larry. American Film Cycles: The Silent Era. Greenwood Publishing, 1998.

External links

1917 films
1917 comedy films
Silent American comedy films
Films directed by Paul Powell (director)
American silent feature films
1910s English-language films
American black-and-white films
Triangle Film Corporation films
1910s American films